Swimming is one of the most popular sports and activities in the world. The following list of swimmers, each of whom has been covered in reliable sources from around the world, is divided up by country, and arranged alphabetically by surname.  This list is by no means complete.

Albania

Algeria

Andorra

Argentina

Aruba

Australia

Austria

Bahamas

Bangladesh

Belarus

Belgium

Brazil

Bulgaria

Cambodia

Canada

China

Colombia

Costa Rica

Croatia

Cuba

Czech Republic

Denmark

Egypt

Equatorial Guinea

Estonia

Faroe Islands

Fiji

Finland

France

Germany

Great Britain

Greece

Guatemala

Hong Kong

Hungary

Iceland

India

Indonesia

Ireland

Israel

Italy

Jamaica

Japan

Kenya

Laos

Latvia

Liechtenstein

Lithuania

Luxembourg

Madagascar

Malaysia

Malta

Mexico

Monaco

Mongolia

Myanmar

Netherlands

New Zealand

Norway

Peru

Philippines

Poland

Portugal

Puerto Rico

Romania

Russia

San Marino

Saudi Arabia

Serbia

Singapore

Slovakia

Slovenia

South Africa

South Korea

Spain

Suriname

Sweden

Switzerland

Thailand

Togo

Trinidad and Tobago

Tunisia

Turkey

Uganda

Ukraine

United States

Uruguay

Venezuela

Zimbabwe

References

External links 
 FINA Hall of Fame
 World Professional Marathon Swimming Federation
 World Open Water Swimming Association

Swimmers